Laurent Boutonnat (born 14 June 1961) is a French film  composer and music video director, best known as the songwriting partner of Mylène Farmer and the director of several groundbreaking music videos.

Career 
Born  in Paris, Laurent Boutonnat directed his first film, Ballade de la Féconductrice, at age 17, while the film itself is rated 18. It would later be screened off competition at the Festival de Cannes. The movie contains multiple graphic elements that would characterize Boutonnat's provocative style.

In 1984, having composed a song called "Maman a tort" with Jérôme Dahan which required a female singer, they started auditioning, and Mylène Farmer, a young student in acting, showed up. Boutonnat and Farmer then started an artistic collaboration which goes on to this day. While Farmer had limited songwriting input on her first album, she thereafter took up a habit of writing all the lyrics while Boutonnat composes the music and arranges it.

Boutonnat also took up Farmer's visual image. He started directing long, big-budget, literature-inspired music videos that took more the shape of short films. His style was widely recognized, especially thanks to the videos "Libertine" and "Pourvu qu'elles soient douces" in which the action takes place during the eighteenth century. Other videos such as "Ainsi soit je..." were appreciated for their simplicity and visual language. Whether they were big productions or simple projects, all of Boutonnat's videos that he created during that time contained many references to literature and art, like Farmer in her lyrics. Boutonnat is sometimes considered to have revolutionized French music videos, including art and cinematic imagery in them and therefore not limiting them to simple commercial tools.

Boutonnat's videos for Farmer contained many nude and sexual provocative scenes which forced the TV stations to ban them from airplay. In the early 1990s, at the end of the promotion of Farmer and Boutonnat's hugely successful album L'autre..., Farmer decided to start working with different music video directors. Boutonnat remained her songwriting partner. The last video he directed for her at that time was "Beyond My Control", which has been banned from daytime TV airplay for violence and sex.

In 1994, Boutonnat directed his first feature film, Giorgino, based on an idea he had had for many years. Starring Farmer, Jeff Dahlgren and Joss Ackland, the film was a major critical and commercial flop at the time, even if more recent reviews of the film are less hostile with the film after it achieved cult status with its DVD release. Personally shaken by the disaster, Boutonnat and Farmer decided to part ways. Farmer exiled herself in the USA where she started writing new lyrics and discovering new music. Shortly afterwards, she reconciled with Boutonnat when she asked him to join her to write the music. The resulting album was a success. The corresponding music videos were not directed by Boutonnat as agreed by both.

After a string of hugely successful albums, Farmer and Boutonnat wrote the first two hugely successful albums of Alizée, the first of them beating sales records. Boutonnat also directed her videos, which were far more commercial and TV-friendly than those he usually directs.

In 2001, Boutonnat directed his first video for Farmer since "Beyond My Control", her hit single "Les Mots" that she recorded with Seal. The video contains many references to Le radeau de la méduse, the famous painting by Géricault.

In 2007, Boutonnat finally directed Jacquou le Croquant, his first feature film since 1994.Variety gave the film a positive review, praising it as "feisty family fare" with "pleasingly Dickensian" themes. Characterizing the film as a "handsomely mounted, old-fashioned mini-epic", Variety singled out its cinematography for praise: "Painterly widescreen lensing wins the day. Shot in the burnished fields and rustic outcroppings of France and Romania, with a preference for classy amber and ochre tones, many scenes look like vintage etchings or oil paintings."

The songwriting partnership between Farmer and Boutonnat is still going strong, with each of their albums having huge success in French-speaking countries.

In December 2010, Farmer released her eighth album, Bleu Noir, without the collaboration of Boutonnat. The album marks the first time that Farmer and Boutonnat did not work together in Farmer's music career. The couple reunited in 2012 composing together all the songs for the album Monkey Me, the albums after that however were again done without Boutonnat. He was however still part of the stage design team on her 2019 tour, and they worked together for the Julia project in 2020.

Theatrical movies 
 Ballade de la Féconductrice (1978)
 Giorgino (1994)
 Jacquou le Croquant (2007)

Live videos 
 Mylène Farmer - En concert (1990)
 Mylène Farmer - Live à Bercy (1997)

Music videos 
 Mylène Farmer - Maman a tort (1984)
 Mylène Farmer - Plus grandir (1985)
 Mylène Farmer - Libertine (1986)
 Mylène Farmer - Tristana (1987)
 Mylène Farmer - Sans Contrefaçon (1987)
 Mylène Farmer - Ainsi soit je... (1988)
 Mylène Farmer - Pourvu qu'elles soient douces (1988)
 Mylène Farmer - Sans Logique (1988)
 Mylène Farmer - A quoi je sers... (1989)
 Mylène Farmer - Allan (Live) (1989)
 Mylène Farmer - Plus Grandir (Live) (1990)
 Mylène Farmer - Désenchantée (1991)
 Mylène Farmer - Regrets (Mylène Farmer and Jean-Louis Murat song) (1991)
 Mylène Farmer - Je t'aime mélancolie (1991)
 Mylène Farmer - Beyond My Control (1992)
 Nathalie Cardone - Hasta Siempre (1997)
 Nathalie Cardone - Populaire (1998)
 Nathalie Cardone - ...Mon Ange (1999)
 Nathalie Cardone - Baila Si (2000)
 Alizée - Moi... Lolita (2000)
 Alizée - Parler tout bas (2001)
 Mylène Farmer - Les Mots (2001)
 Mylène Farmer - Pardonne-moi (2002)
 Alizée - J'ai pas vingt ans (2003)
 Kamal Kacet - Ifkis (2004)
 Mylène Farmer - Du temps (2011)
 Mylène Farmer - A l'ombre (2012)
 Mylène Farmer - N'oublie Pas (2018)
 Julia - S.E.X.T.O  (2018)
 Julia - Passe... comme tu sais (2019)
 Julia - Et toi mon amour (2020)

Albums 
Laurent Boutonnat worked as composer and producer on all the listed albums
 Mylène Farmer - Cendres de Lune (1986)
 Mylène Farmer - Ainsi soit je... (1989)
 Mylène Farmer - L'Autre_(Mylène_Farmer_album) (1991)
 Mylène Farmer - Dance Remixes (1992)
 Mylène Farmer - Anamorphosée (1995)
 Nathalie Cardone - Album éponyme (1999)
 Mylène Farmer - Innamoramento (1999)
 Alizée - Gourmandises (2000)
 Mylène Farmer - Les Mots (2001)
 Alizée - Mes courants électriques... (2003)
 Mylène Farmer - Avant que l'ombre... (2005)
 Mylène Farmer - Point de Suture (2008)
 Mylène Farmer - Monkey Me (2012)
 Julia - Passe... comme tu sais (2020)

Movie soundtracks 

 Giorgino (1994)
 Le Pèlerin (1995)
 Jacquou le Croquant (2006)

References

External links 
 Official website for the movie Giorgino
 Official website for the movie Jacquou le croquant
 french website about Laurent Boutonnat
 German website about the 1994 movie Giorgino

1961 births
French film directors
French male composers
French songwriters
Living people
Male songwriters